Kurkowo may refer to:

Kurkowo, Podlaskie Voivodeship, a village in the administrative district of Gmina Grabowo, Poland
Kurkowo, Pomeranian Voivodeship, a village in the administrative district of Gmina Czersk, Poland